Charles L. Webster and Company was an American subscription publishing firm founded in New York in 1884 by author and journalist Samuel Clemens, popularly known as Mark Twain. The firm was closed after declaring bankruptcy in 1894.

History
Founded in 1884, the firm was named after Clemens' niece’s husband Charles L. Webster whom Clemens appointed the firm's business director. The formation of the company came out of Clemens' dissatisfaction with his previous publishers including Charles H. Webb,  Elisha Bliss, and James R. Osgood. Clemens wanted to earn a dual income as both author and publisher of books.  The first two American publications  of the firm, Adventures of Huckleberry Finn (1885) and the Personal Memoirs of Ulysses S. Grant (1885) were highly successful. The Ulysses S. Grant memoir publication in particular financially helped Grant and his family at a time when Grant was sick, having been diagnosed with throat cancer. Grant was a former President of the United States and top commanding general during the Civil War and Reconstruction. After Grant's death, Clemens gave Grant's widowed wife, Julia, a substantial royalty check of $450,000, the equivalent of 11 million dollars today. According to Webster, prior to his death, Grant dictated the last part of the second volume to a stenographer working for the firm, due to writing fatigue, starting with Robert E. Lee's surrender at Appomattox. Webster, who accompanied the stenographer, respected Grant's reputation and honored his request to keep secret from reporters that Grant dictated part of the book.

Other books later published by the firm were not as successful and soon Clemens had to reinvest profits back into the firm to make up for losses. In 1888, as the company financially suffered, Clemens fired Webster, who was at odds with him on how to run the firm successfully. Webster, himself, had been overworked traveling throughout the United States visiting the firm's principal agents. As the firm grew deeper in debt, Clemens was forced to close the business having formally declared bankruptcy on April 18, 1894. The firms most productive years, although not financially, were from 1891 to 1893. Notable authors published, including Clemens, were Leo Tolstoy, Henry George, and Walt Whitman.

Selected list of published books

1884
 Adventures of Huckleberry Finn United Kingdom by Samuel Clemens

1885
 Adventures of Huckleberry Finn United States by Samuel Clemens
 Personal Memoirs of Ulysses S. Grant Volumes 1 & 2 by Ulysses S. Grant

1886
 McClellan's Own Story: The War for the Union, the Soldiers Who Fought It, the Civilians Who Directed It, and His Relations to It and to Them by George B. McClellan

1887
 Tenting on the Plains; or, General Custer in Kansas and Texas by Elizabeth Custer
 The Life of Pope Leo the XIII by Father Bernard O'Reilly
 Reminiscences of Winfield Scott Hancock by Almira Russell Hancock

1888
 Personal Memoirs of P.H. Sheridan, General, United States Army Volumes 1 & 2 by Philip Sheridan

1889
 The Life and Letters of Roscoe Conkling, Orator, Statesman, Advocate by Alfred R. Conkling
 A Connecticut Yankee in King Arthur's Court by Samuel Clemens

1890
 Memoirs of Gen. W. T. Sherman by William T. Sherman

1891
 Adventures of a Fair Rebel by Matt Crim 
 Tinkletop's Crime by George Robert Sims
 Ivan the Fool; or, The Old Devil and the Three Small Devils, also A Lost Opportunity, and Polikshka by Leo Tolstoy

1892
The Master of Silence: A Romance by Irving Bacheller
Moonblight and Six Feet of Romance by Daniel C. Beard 
The German Emperor and His Eastern Neighbors by Poultney Bigelow
Writings of Christopher Columbus, Descriptive of the Discovery of the New World by Christopher Columbus
Life is Worth Living, and Other Stories by Leo Tolstoy 
The American Claimant by Samuel Clemens
Merry Tales by Samuel Clemens 
Selected Poems by Walt Whitman 
Autobiographia, or, the Story of a Life by Walt Whitman

1893
A Catastrophe in Bohemia and Other Stories by Henry S. Brooks
The Art of Sketching by Gustave B. Fraipont 
Social Problems by Henry George
Stories from the Rabbis by Abram Samuel Isaacs 
The £1,000,000 Bank-note and Other New Stories by Samuel Clemens

1894
Tom Sawyer Abroad by Samuel Clemens
Alfred Lord Tennyson by Arthur Waugh

References

Sources

Publishing companies of the United States
1884 establishments in New York (state)
1894 disestablishments in New York (state)
American companies established in 1884
American companies disestablished in 1894
Publishing companies established in 1884
Publishing companies disestablished in 1894